Xi Pegasi (ξ Peg, ξ Pegasi) is the Bayer designation for a double star in the northern constellation of Pegasus, the winged horse. Located in the horse's neck, the primary component is an F-type main sequence star that is visible to the naked eye with an apparent visual magnitude of 4.2. It is 86% larger and 17% more massive that the Sun, radiating 4.5 times the solar luminosity. Based upon parallax measurements taken with the Hipparcos spacecraft, it is located 53.2 ± 0.2 light years from the Sun.

The primary has been examined for the presence of an infrared excess that might indicate the presence of a debris disk, but none has been discovered. The common proper motion companion, NLTT 54820, is a twelfth magnitude red dwarf located at an angular separation of 11.4″ along a position angle of 96.9°. This corresponds to a projected physical separation of 192.3 AU.

References

External links
 

F-type main-sequence stars
Pegasus (constellation)
Pegasi, Xi
Pegasi, 46
112447
Binary stars
M-type main-sequence stars
8665
215648
Durchmusterung objects
0872